Produce 101 Japan is Japanese reality competition show and a spin-off of the South Korean television series Produce 101. 101 trainees, aged 16–30 years old who are not affiliated with any talent agency, will be competing to debut in an 11-member boy band, with members selected by live voting from the viewers.

Contestants

The spelling of names in English is according to the official website. The Japanese contestants are presented in Western order (given name, family name), while the names of the Korean contestants are presented in Eastern order (family name, given name).

Color key

Position Battle Evaluation Performances (Episodes 3–4)

Color key
Bold denotes the person who picked the team members. Each person, selected via lottery, chose a song of his choice with a maximum of twelve people per song. Afterwards, the highest-ranking member of each group chose five people to be on his team, while the remaining members become their opposing team. There was nobody who chose "Tamashii Revolution" first, so Ryuji Sato was selected to pick the team members.

Group Battle Evaluation Performances (Episodes 6–7)

Color key
Bold denotes the person who chose the team members, with priority given to higher-ranked trainees. Ren Kawashiri was ranked #1 during the first eliminations and chose his team first. The remaining trainees were only allowed to pick four people, and the nine trainees left over were each allowed to pick the team of their choice. Songs were chosen through a medley race consisting of a cargo net crawl, disentanglement puzzle, and balloon popping. The individual winner of each group gets a 20,000 point bonus, the overall individual winner gets a 50,000 point bonus, and the overall group winners get a 100,000 point bonus.

Concept Evaluation (Episode 9–10)

Members of each group are selected by audience vote on their official website between the broadcasts of episodes 5 and 6 (October 24 at 11:30 PM to October 30 at 5:00 AM (JST)). After episode 8, teams with more than 7 members vote on which members will leave, while teams who have less than 7 members have the opportunity to recruit them.

Debut Evaluation Performances (Episode 12)

Color key

Notes

References

 
Produce 101 Japan contestants
Produce 101 Japan contestants
Produce 101 Japan contestants
Produce 101 Japan contestants